Frederick Robert Goodall  (9 January 1938 – 18 October 2021) was a New Zealand international cricket umpire who officiated in 24 Tests and 15 One-Day Internationals between 1965 and 1988.

Goodall was the son of Fred and Betty Goodall from Greymouth. He umpired his first first-class match in December 1963, and went on to umpire 102 first-class matches before retiring in 1989. His debut as a One-Day International umpire was at Christchurch in February 1973, the first one-day international played in New Zealand. He had made his Test debut eight years earlier, also in Christchurch.

During the Second Test between New Zealand and West Indies at Christchurch's Lancaster Park in February 1980, the West Indies considered his umpiring so poor that they refused to emerge from their dressing room after the tea break on the third day unless Goodall was immediately replaced. After 11 minutes, they were persuaded to resume. Colin Croft collided with Goodall at the end of his bowling run-up during the fourth day's play. West Indies captain Clive Lloyd later said of the incident, "They were just bad umpires but we should not have behaved in that manner. I think if I'd had my time over again I'd have handled it differently. I regret it even until this day, that things went so far."

Goodall continued officiating in Tests and one-day matches after the infamous Christchurch incident. His last international match was a One-Day International at Napier in March 1988.

In the 1999 New Year Honours, Goodall was appointed an Officer of the New Zealand Order of Merit, for services to sport. 

Goodall died in Wellington on 18 October 2021, aged 83.

See also
 List of Test cricket umpires
 List of One Day International cricket umpires

References

1938 births
2021 deaths
Sportspeople from Greymouth
New Zealand Test cricket umpires
New Zealand One Day International cricket umpires
Officers of the New Zealand Order of Merit
People educated at Greymouth High School